Lionel Walden (May 22, 1862–1933) was an American painter active in Hawaii, Cornwall, and France.

Biography
He was born in Norwich, Connecticut, in 1862.  He first became interested in art in Minnesota, where the family moved when his father Treadwell became rector of an Episcopal Church there.  As a young man, Walden moved to Paris, where he studied painting with Carolus-Duran.  In around 1893–97, Walden was in England, living in Falmouth. Paintings of Cardiff in Wales are in museums in Cardiff, Paris, and Abu Dhabi. Walden received medals from the Paris Salon and was made a Knight of the French Legion of Honor.  He visited Hawaii in 1911 and several times thereafter.  Walden died in Chantilly, France in 1933.
 
According to David H. Forbes, author of Encounters with Paradise: Views of Hawaii and its People, 1778–1941, Lionel Walden "was the finest seascape painter to work in Hawaii".  The Brooklyn Museum, the Henry Art Gallery (University of Washington, Seattle), the Honolulu Museum of Art, the Isaacs Art Center (Waimea, Hawaii), the Musée des Beaux-Arts de Quimper and the Musée d'Orsay are among the public collections holding works by Lionel Walden.

Notable works
The auction record for a painting by Lionel Walden is $73,440.  This record was set by Breaking Waves, a 24 by 51.5 inch oil painting on canvas sold March 2, 2007, at Skinner Inc. (Marlborough, Massachusetts).

A painting by Walden, "The Wave" (1908) is since 2015 in the collection of the Musée des Beaux-Arts of Quimper (France), (don d'Elisabeth Willmott et Jean-David Jumeau-Lafond en mémoire de Jean et Jacqueline Jumeau-Lafond).

Relatives
Walden was the brother of Arthur Treadwell Walden.

Gallery

Notes

References
 Ellis, George R. and Marcia Morse, A Hawaii Treasury, Masterpieces from the Honolulu Academy of Arts, Tokyo, Asahi Shimbun, 2000, 154, 224–5.
 Forbes, David W., Encounters with Paradise: Views of Hawaii and its People, 1778–1941, Honolulu Academy of Arts, 1992, 206–244.
 Forbes, David W., He Makana, The Gertrude Mary Joan Damon Haig Collection of Hawaiian Art, Paintings and Prints, Hawaii State Foundation of Culture and the Arts, 2013, pp. 64–71

1862 births
1933 deaths
19th-century American painters
19th-century American male artists
20th-century American painters
20th-century American male artists
American expatriates in France
American expatriates in the United Kingdom
American landscape painters
American male painters
American marine artists
Artists from Connecticut
People from Norwich, Connecticut
Volcano School painters